The 2019 DusitD2 complex attack was a terrorist attack that occurred from 15 to 16 January 2019 in the Westlands area of Nairobi, Kenya, which left 22 civilians and all five terrorists dead.

Background
The Islamist militant group Al-Shabaab has been opposed to Kenyan involvement in the Somali Civil War. The terrorist group had previously attacked the suburb of Westlands during the 2013 Westgate shopping mall attack, which left 67 people dead. In 2015, Al-shabaab terrorists were involved in mass shooting of Garissa University College students leaving 147 dead and many others injured. This incident was the country's worst terrorist attack since the 1998 United States embassy bombings, which left over 200 people dead.

Location
The attack occurred at the 14 Riverside Drive complex in Westlands, Nairobi, Kenya. This is an upscale hotel and office complex which hosts the DusitD2 Hotel and the Commission on Revenue Allocation. Other clients of the complex, amongst others, include: Adam Smith International, Amadeus IT Group, LG Electronics, I & M bank, JHPiego, SAP East Africa and Cellulant Kenya Ltd.

Incident
The attack began at 14:30 on 15 January 2019, and was concluded a few minutes before 10:00 the following day. Initial reports were of gunfire and two explosions at the hotel. The five attackers, arrived in two vehicles. One of the attackers went discreetly and blew himself up next to Secret Garden restaurant. After the blast the remaining terrorists forced guards to open the gates of 14 Riverside Drive by shooting at them and lobbing grenades as they made their way into the complex, igniting some vehicles parked in the parking bay. The Recce company, the anti terrorism division of the Kenya police force, General Service Unit, were sent in to combat the militants. Members of private security forces and unarmed individuals along with some off duty police officers were first to respond.

A masked (wearing balaclava) member of the British SAS, Christian Craighead, who was in the country to conduct training, accompanied by a member of the Diplomatic Protective Services Tactical Response Unit (DPS-TRU) (Dan J. Prastalo) indicating "Agent" sign and a shield badge on his tactical vest, started clearing floor by floor of the office and car park buildings. They were heard shouting call sign "Eagle Eagle Security Forces" as they tried to call out hostages that were hiding. Both individuals were seen on the mainstream media clips escorting groups of hostages and carrying wounded ones, before running back into the complex while the attackers were shooting down on them. Australian High Commission security detail also exchanged fire with the terrorists as they made their way into the complex, injuring one attacker. While it had been thought that the attack had been neutralized after a few hours, gunfire and explosions were again heard early on 16 January. Christian Craighead shot and killed two of the attackers and was awarded the Conspicuous Gallantry Cross for his extreme bravery.

President of Kenya Uhuru Kenyatta initially said that 14 people had been killed; later on 16 January it was reported that 21 civilians and five attackers had been killed. A year after the attack, on 15 January 2020, hotel nurse Noel Kidaliza, who was critically injured during the attack, died of her wounds at a hospital, bringing the death toll to 22.

Al-Shabaab claimed responsibility for the attack in a statement that was released during the attack. They claimed that the attack was "a response to US President Donald Trump's decision to recognize Jerusalem as the capital of Israel".

Aftermath 
Nineteen Kenyan citizens, an American and a British-South African man died during the attack. A Kenyan woman died a year later after succumbing to her wounds, bringing the civilian death toll to 22.

Immediately after the incident concluded, the 14 Riverside Drive complex and its immediate environs were closed to public as police termed the area an active scene of crime. Security agencies were able to trace the residence of the terror suspects to Kiambu, Mombasa and Nyeri counties. On 17 January, the Kenya Red Cross Society informed the public that all who had earlier been listed as missing had been accounted for. The National Police Service was lauded for its well-organized response that saw close to 700 people being rescued from the hotel complex. On 19 January 2019, five people appeared in court accused of assisting in the terrorist attack. On the same day, the Australian embassy denied allegations that one of the fatalities was an Australian. Initially both Kenyan and Australian media houses had stated that one of the victims an Australian citizen and was visiting his girlfriend in Kenya before his death in the attack.

In popular culture 
In the game Call of Duty: Modern Warfare (2019), a playable skin is based on the British SAS Christian Craighead.

See also 
 2011–14 terrorist attacks in Kenya
 2018 Inter-Continental Hotel Kabul attack
 Garissa University College attack (2015)
 Terrorism in Kenya

References

2019 in Kenya
2019 mass shootings in Africa
2019 murders in Kenya
Explosions in 2019
2010s in Nairobi
Attacks on hotels in Africa
Al-Shabaab (militant group) attacks
Islamic terrorist incidents in 2019
Islamic terrorism in Kenya
January 2019 crimes in Africa
January 2019 events in Africa
Mass murder in 2019
Mass shootings in Africa
Massacres in Kenya
Terrorist incidents in Kenya in 2019
2019 Nairobi attack